Ulf Hannerz, (born June 9, 1942, in Malmö) is a Swedish anthropologist. He is currently an emeritus professor of social anthropology at Stockholm University. He is also a member of the Royal Swedish Academy of Sciences., the American Academy of Arts and Sciences and the Austrian Academy of Sciences.

Hannerz's research interests includes urban societies, local media cultures, transnational cultural processes, and globalization. His works Soulside and Exploring the City are classic books in the area of urban anthropology.

Hannerz is the author of “Cosmopolitans and Locals in World Culture” (1990). His theory essentially explores cosmopolitanism from the analysis of expatriates.

In 2000, Hannerz delivered the Lewis Henry Morgan Lecture at the University of Rochester, considered by many to be the most important annual lecture series in the field of Anthropology.

In 2005, he received an honorary doctorate from The Faculty of Social Sciences, University of Oslo.

The 10,000 Kronor Question

Hannerz gained some notability as a child, when he appeared on the first episode of the television game show Kvitt eller dubbelt - 10.000 kronorsfrågan (literally: Double or Nothing - The 10,000 Kronor Question), which was based on the American television show The $64,000 Question. In the first episode, aired on 12 January 1957, 14-year-old Hannerz presented by his nickname Hajen (The Shark), was quizzed on the subject "tropical aquarium fish". Hannerz succeeded in winning 10,000 Kronor in spite of a judgement error in the program. The judge asked him which of the seven displayed fish had lids. He answered "hundfisk" (mudminnow). "No," the judge said, "it's slamkrypare (mudskipper)."  He wanted to dismiss young Ulf from the game show. However, Ulf Hannerz was indeed correct, and the name slamkrypare (mudskipper) entered the Swedish language as a term for a cocksure, but incorrect, assertion.

Books
(1969, 2004) Soulside: Inquiries into Ghetto Culture and Community 2004: 
(1974) Caymanian Politics: Structure and Style in a Changing Island Society
(1980) Exploring the City: Inquiries Toward an Urban Anthropology, 
 (2006) Spanish translation: La exploracion de la ciudad, 
(1992) Cultural Complexity: Studies in the Social Organization of Meaning
(1996) Transnational Connections: Culture, People, Places
 (1998) Spanish translation: Conexiones transnacionales - Cultura, gente, lugares, 
 (2006) Polish translation: Powiązania transnarodowe: kultura, ludzie, miejsca, 
(2000, with Kjell Goldmann, Ulf Hannerz, Charles Westin, eds.) Nationalism and Internationalism in the Post-Cold War Era
(2000) Flows, Boundaries and Hybrids: Keywords in Transnational Anthropology
(1992) Culture, Cities and the World
(1986, with Ulla Wagner) Anthropology of Immigration in Sweden
(2004) Foreign News: Exploring the World of Foreign Correspondents
(2010) Anthropology's World: Life in a Twenty-First Century Discipline 
(2016) Writing Future Worlds: An Anthropologist Explores Global Scenarios. New York.
(2017) Small Countries: Structures and Sensibilities. (ed., with Andre Gingrich) Philadelphia.
(2019) World Watching: Streetcorners and Newsbeats on a Journey through Anthropology. London.
(2021) Afropolitan Horizons: Essays toward a Literary Anthropology of Nigeria.

Further reading

References

Swedish anthropologists
Social anthropologists
Living people
1942 births
Academic staff of Stockholm University
Members of the Royal Swedish Academy of Sciences
People from Malmö